In mathematics and computer science, a recursive definition, or inductive definition, is used to define the elements in a set in terms of other elements in the set (Aczel 1977:740ff). Some examples of recursively-definable objects include factorials, natural numbers, Fibonacci numbers, and the Cantor ternary set.

A recursive definition of a function defines values of the function for some inputs in terms of the values of the same function for other (usually smaller) inputs. For example, the factorial function  is defined by the rules

This definition is valid for each natural number , because the recursion eventually reaches the base case of 0.

The recursion theorem states that such a definition indeed defines a function that is unique. The proof uses mathematical induction.

An inductive definition of a set describes the elements in a set in terms of other elements in the set. For example, one definition of the set  of natural numbers is:
1 is in 
If an element n is in  then  is in 
 is the intersection of all sets satisfying (1) and (2).

There are many sets that satisfy (1) and (2) – for example, the set  satisfies the definition. However, condition (3) specifies the set of natural numbers by removing the sets with extraneous members. Note that this definition assumes that  is contained in a larger set (such as the set of real numbers) — in which the operation + is defined.

Properties of recursively defined functions and sets can often be proved by an induction principle that follows the recursive definition.

Form of recursive definitions
Most recursive definitions have two foundations: a base case (basis) and an inductive clause.

The difference between a circular definition and a recursive definition is that a recursive definition must always have base cases, cases that satisfy the definition without being defined in terms of the definition itself, and that all other instances in the inductive clauses must be "smaller" in some sense (i.e., closer to those base cases that terminate the recursion) — a rule also known as "recur only with a simpler case".

In contrast, a circular definition may have no base case, and even may define the value of a function in terms of that value itself — rather than on other values of the function. Such a situation would lead to an infinite regress.

That recursive definitions are valid – meaning that a recursive definition identifies a unique function – is a theorem of set theory known as the recursion theorem, the proof of which is non-trivial.

More generally, recursive definitions of functions can be made whenever the domain is a well-ordered set, using the principle of transfinite recursion. The formal criteria for what constitutes a valid recursive definition are more complex for the general case. An outline of the general proof and the criteria can be found in James Munkres' Topology. However, a specific case (domain is restricted to the positive integers instead of any well-ordered set) of the general recursive definition will be given below.

Principle of recursive definition 

Examples of recursive definitions

Elementary functions
Addition is defined recursively based on counting as

Multiplication is defined recursively as

Exponentiation is defined recursively as

Binomial coefficients can be defined recursively as

Prime numbers
The set of prime numbers can be defined as the unique set of positive integers satisfying
 1 is not a prime number,
 any other positive integer is a prime number if and only if it is not divisible by any prime number smaller than itself.

Non-negative even numbers
The even numbers can be defined as consisting of
 0 is in the set  of non-negative evens (basis clause),
 Nothing is in  unless it is obtained from the basis and inductive clauses (extremal clause).

Well formed formulas
It is chiefly in logic or computer programming that recursive definitions are found. For example, a well-formed formula (wff) can be defined as:
a symbol which stands for a proposition – like  means "Connor is a lawyer."
The negation symbol, followed by a wff – like  means "It is not true that Connor is a lawyer."
Any of the four binary connectives – negation, conjunction, disjunction, and implication – followed by two wffs. The symbol ∧ (AND) means "both are true", so  may mean "Connor is a lawyer, and Mary likes music."

The value of such a recursive definition is that it can be used to determine whether any particular string of symbols is "well formed".

  is well formed, because it is AND followed by the atomic wffs .

See also 
Mathematical induction
Recursive data types
 Recursion
Structural induction

Notes

References 

 
 
 

Definition
Mathematical logic
Theoretical computer science
Recursion